Lucinda "Lucy" Sanders (born 1954) is the current CEO and a co-founder of the National Center for Women & Information Technology. She is the recipient of many distinguished honors in the STEM fields, including induction into the US News STEM Leadership Hall of Fame  in 2013.

Early age and education
At an early age, Sanders displayed an interest in the STEM fields. Sanders had three main influences that led her to pursue an education in computer science: her father, her high school math teacher, and her sister. Her father was an  early adopter of computer science when it first began to develop as a large scale field, her high school teacher taught Sanders skills required for computer programming, and her sister became successful after receiving one of the early degrees in computer science.
Upon graduating from high school, Sanders attended Louisiana State University and received her bachelor's degree in computer science. Sanders then attended the University of Colorado Boulder where she attained a master's degree in computer science.

Professional career

In her early career, Sanders worked as a Research and Development (R&D) Manager at Bell Labs. She later became an executive vice president and worked as the CTO of Lucent Customer Care Solutions until 1999. She moved on from Bell Labs to work at Inc CRM Solutions at Avaya Labs for two years, until she founded the National Center for Women and Information Technology in 2004, where she currently works as the CEO.
She also previously held a position in the board of the Alliance for Technology, Learning, and Society (Atlas), the Denver Public Schools Computer Magnet Advisory Board, the MSRI, the Engineering Advisory Council at the University of Colorado at Boulder, and is a Trustee for the Center for American Entrepreneurship and the International Computer Science Institute.

NCWIT

Sanders initially co-founded the National Center for Women & Information Technology in 2004, when she was given a grant from the National Science Foundation. Along with Telle Whitney and Robert Schnabel, Sanders hoped to use NCWIT to increase the number of women in computer fields. Sanders is currently working as the day to day CEO of the National Center for Women & Information Technology.

Publications
Improving Gender Composition in Computing, Jill Ross, Liz Litzler, Joanne Cohoon and Lucy Sanders, Communications of the ACM, April 2012  
Strategy Trumps Money: Recruiting Undergraduate Women into Computing, Lecia J. Barker, J. McGrath Cohoon, and Lucy Sanders, IEEE Computer Magazine, 2010.
Committee on Assessing the Impacts of Changes in the Information Technology Research and Development Ecosystem: Retaining Leadership in an Increasingly Global Environment, National Research Council of the National Academies, January 2009.
IT Innovation and the Role of Diversity, Lucinda Sanders, Black IT Professional Magazine, Summer 2006.
Ahuja, Sid and Sanders, Lucinda M., “Multimedia Collaboration”, AT&T Technical Journal, October 1995.
Katz, Bryan and Sanders, Lucinda M., “MMCX Server Delivers Multimedia Here and Now”, AT&T Technology, Winter 1995 – 1996.
Glass, Kathleen K. and Sanders, Lucinda M. (1992). “Managing Organizational Handoffs with Empowered Teams”. AT&T Technical Journal (22) Volume 71 Number 3, pp. 22 – 29.

Awards and recognition
Bob Newman Lifetime Achievement Award, Colorado Technology Association, 2016
US News STEM Leadership Hall of Fame, 2013 
A. Nico Habermann Award, 2012 
George Norlin Distinguished Service Award, 2011 
Boulder County Business Review Outstanding Women, 2010 
Community Partner, Microsoft, 2009 
Girl Scouts Woman of Distinction, 2008 
WITI Hall of Fame, 2007 
Soroptimist International of Los Angeles Women of Vision Award, 2006 
Aspen Institute Executive Seminar Academic Scholarship, 2005 
CU Boulder Distinguished Engineering Alumni Award for "Industry and Commerce", 2004 
Silicon Valley Tribute to Women in Industry Award for business excellence and community outreach, 2000 
Bell Labs Fellow Award, 1996

Interviews

See also
Women in Computing
Information Technology
Computer Science

References

American women computer scientists
American computer scientists
Living people
Women nonprofit executives
University of Colorado Boulder alumni
Louisiana State University alumni
1954 births
21st-century American women